Moscow Korean School (MKS; ;  "Shkola Pri Posol'stve Respubliki Koreya V Moskve") is a Korean international school in Moscow, Russia. It is the only school approved as a Korean international school by the South Korean government in Europe.  it served kindergarten and elementary school. It was formerly in Mozhaysky District.

The school first opened in 1992. Around 2012 the school moved into a new building.

See also

 Russia–South Korea relations

References

External links
 Moscow Korean School 
 English information
 

International schools in Moscow
Korean international schools
1992 establishments in Russia
Educational institutions established in 1992